Canyon County is located in the U.S. state of Idaho. As of the 2020 Census, the population was 231,105, making it the second-most populous county in Idaho. The county seat is Caldwell, and its largest city is Nampa. Canyon County is part of the Boise metropolitan area.

History
Hudson's Bay Company established Fort Boise in 1834 near what is now Parma, but abandoned it in 1855. Emigrants traveled through Canyon County on the Oregon Trail.

Discovery of gold in the Boise Basin in 1862 brought settlement to the region again. The lower Boise River was fully contained within Boise County from 1863 until the formation of Ada County in 1864. Settlement of the lower Boise River west of Boise City was limited prior to the completion of the Oregon Short Line Railroad. Middleton was the first settlement of Canyon County, starting in 1863. The 1870 Census for Ada County listed 76 residents of the Boise Valley, excluding Boise City and the 1880 Census listed 44 residents at Middleton. The arrival of the railroad at Caldwell led to the establishment of a town there as of August 1883.

Businessmen James A. McGee and Alexander Duffes filed the plat for nearby Nampa in 1886. Parma was settled around the same time, with the Old Fort Boise post office being moved to the town's location; it was incorporated in 1904. Ada County established precincts for each of the settlements with a combined 1890 Census population of 2,311. Significant settlement of Greenleaf and Notus started around 1904 with the two settlements listed as precincts at the 1910 census. Notus was incorporated in 1921 while Greenleaf was incorporated prior to 1980. Melba was incorporated in 1912 while Wilder was incorporated in 1919. The City of Star annexed a portion of territory in northeast Canyon County prior to 2007, becoming the county's ninth incorporated city. The majority of Star is located within Ada County.

The Idaho Legislature created Canyon County from Ada County in an act approved March 7, 1891, effective at the November 26, 1892 election. Caldwell was established as the county seat. The county originally contained all of Canyon and Payette counties and part of Gem; Gem County formed in 1915 and Payette County in 1917. Some sources attribute the name to the canyon of the Boise River near Caldwell, while western writers John Rees and Vardis Fisher believed it was named for the Snake River canyon, which forms a natural boundary with Owyhee County to the south and west.

Geography

Adjacent counties
Payette County (north)
Gem County (northeast)
Ada County (east)
Owyhee County (south)
Malheur County, Oregon (west)

National protected areas
 Deer Flat National Wildlife Refuge (part)
 Snake River Birds of Prey National Conservation Area (part)

Major highways

  Interstate 84
  US 20
  US 26
  US 30
  US 95
  SH-19
  SH-44
  SH-45
  SH-55

Demographics

2000 census
At the 2000 census, there were 131,441 people, 45,018 households and 33,943 families living in the county. The population density was 223/square mile (86/square km). There were 47,965 housing units at an average density of 81/square mile (31/square km). The racial makeup of the county was 83.10% White, 0.32% Black or African American, 0.85% Native American, 0.80% Asian, 0.13% Pacific Islander, 12.17% from other races, and 2.62% from two or more races. Hispanic or Latino of any race were 18.61% of the population. 15.9% were of German, 12.7% English, 10.3% American and 7.6% Irish ancestry.

There were 45,018 households, of which 39.80% had children under the age of 18 living with them, 60.70% were married couples living together, 10.10% had a female householder with no husband present, and 24.60% were non-families. 19.80% of all households were made up of individuals, and 8.40% had someone living alone who was 65 years of age or older. The average household size was 2.85 and the average family size was 3.28.

30.90% of the population were under the age of 18, 10.70% from 18 to 24, 28.30% from 25 to 44, 19.10% from 45 to 64, and 11.00% who were 65 years of age or older. The median age was 30 years. For every 100 females, there were 98.70 males. For every 100 females age 18 and over, there were 96.30 males.

The median household income was $35,884 and the median family income was $40,377. Males had a median income of $29,418 compared with $22,044 for females. The per capita income for the county was $15,155. About 8.70% of families and 12.00% of the population were below the poverty line, including 14.50% of those under age 18 and 10.70% of those age 65 or over.

2010 census
As of the 2010 United States Census, there were 188,923 people, 63,604 households, and 47,481 families living in the county. The racial makeup of the county was 83.0% white, 1.1% American Indian, 0.8% Asian, 0.6% black or African American, 0.2% Pacific islander, 11.4% from other races, and 3.0% from two or more races. Those of Hispanic or Latino origin made up 23.9% of the population. In terms of ancestry, 18.8% were American, 17.4% were German, 13.0% were English, and 8.8% were Irish.

Of the 63,604 households, 42.7% had children under the age of 18 living with them, 56.7% were married couples living together, 12.3% had a female householder with no husband present, 25.3% were non-families, and 20.1% of all households were made up of individuals. The average household size was 2.92 and the average family size was 3.36. The median age was 31.6 years.

The median income for a household in the county was $43,218 and the median income for a family was $48,219. Males had a median income of $38,132 versus $28,356 for females. The per capita income for the county was $18,366. About 12.7% of families and 17.3% of the population were below the poverty line, including 23.8% of those under age 18 and 8.5% of those age 65 or over.

Communities

Cities

Caldwell
Greenleaf 
Melba
Middleton
Nampa
Notus
Parma
Star (partially)
Wilder

Unincorporated communities
 Bowmont
 Huston
 Riverside
 Roswell
 Sunnyslope
 Walters Ferry, Idaho

Politics
Like the majority of Idaho, Canyon County is reliably Republican by comfortable margins. The last time a Democratic candidate carried the county was in 1936 by Franklin D. Roosevelt. In elections, Republican candidates usually achieve approximately two-thirds of the vote from Canyon County.

Education
School districts include:
 Caldwell School District 132
 Homedale Joint School District 370
 Kuna Joint School District 3
 Marsing Joint School District 363
 Melba Joint School District 136
 Middleton School District 134
 Nampa School District 131
 Notus School District 135
 Parma School District 137
 Vallivue School District 139
 West Ada School District (Meridian Joint School District 2)
 Wilder School District 133

See also
National Register of Historic Places listings in Canyon County, Idaho
Vallivue School District

References

External links

  - Canyon County
 Western Canyon Chronicle - Official newspaper for Parma, Notus, Wilder & Greenleaf, in Canyon County, Idaho

 

 
Idaho counties
1891 establishments in Idaho
Boise metropolitan area
Populated places established in 1891